Touring Talkies is a 2015 Tamil anthology film written and directed by S.A.Chandrasekhar. The film consists of two stories in which S.A.Chandrasekhar himself acted in the lead role with Kolkata actress Papri Gosh along with Abi Saravanan and Manobala. Kerala actress Sunulekshmi, Ashwin Kumar, Roboshankar, Jayabalan, Sevvalai, form the cast in the second story. The music score is composed by Ilaiyaraaja. The audio launch happened on 26 January 2015. The film was released on 30 January 2015.

Cast
S. A. Chandrasekhar as Anthony
Abi Saravanan as young Anthony
Papri Ghosh as Hema
Manobala as Koteeswaran
A. Venkatesh as Doctor
Robo Shankar as Chinnaiyya
V. I. S. Jayapalan as President
Sunu Lakshmi as Poongodi
Ashwin Kumar as Ashwin
Gayatri Rema
Cameo appearances in promotional song
Jiiva
Ameer
Soori
Vivek
Sathyan
Vijay Antony
Ilaiyaraaja

Production
S. A. Chandrasekar announced that his 69th directorial titled "Touring Talkies" will have two stories in the film. He announced that this would be his last film as director and also appeared in a character of 75-year-old man. The first story was shot on Shimla whereas the second story was shot in and around Theni

Soundtrack
Soundtrack was composed by Ilaiyaraaja.

Release
Sify stated that "SAC’s new experiment is not an easy one to execute and he has made the film in an engaging manner. He needs a pat on his back just for that. The message underlying in the film is much needed for the society". Times of India noted that: "In the first film, Love @ 75, [..] SAC tries to go all emo with this old couple romance in which the premise is hardly novel. [..] The next film, Selvi 5am Vaguppu, deals with sensitive topics — child rape and caste issues."

References

External links
 .

2015 films
Indian anthology films
Films scored by Ilaiyaraaja
2010s Tamil-language films
Films about child abuse
Films directed by S. A. Chandrasekhar